Muhammad Akbar Hayat Hiraj is a Pakistani politician who was a Member of the Provincial Assembly of the Punjab, from May 2013 to May 2018.

Early life and education
He was born on 18 April 1973 in Multan.

He graduated in 1993 from Government College, Lahore. He has the degree of Master of Science in International Relations which he obtained in 1996 from Quaid-e-Azam University and the degree of Master of Business Administration which he received in 2001 from American InterContinental University.

Political career

He was elected to the Provincial Assembly of the Punjab as an independent candidate from Constituency PP-212 (Khanewal-I) in 2013 Pakistani general election. He joined Pakistan Muslim League (N) in May 2013.

References

Living people
Punjab MPAs 2013–2018
1973 births
Pakistan Muslim League (N) politicians